Zara Malseed (born 11 June 1997) is an Irish field hockey player. She competed in the 2020 Summer Olympics.

Early years, family and education
Zara grew up in Holywood, County Down, Northern Ireland where she attended Sullivan Upper School.

Club Hockey
Zara competed for The University of Edinburgh where she attained a First Class honours in Chemical Engineering.

She now competes for Ards Ladies Hockey Club in County Down.

Ireland International

Occupational career

References

External links
 Zara Malseed at Hockey Ireland
 
 
 
 

1997 births
Living people
Field hockey players at the 2020 Summer Olympics
Irish female field hockey players
Olympic field hockey players of Ireland